Emmanuel Okala (born May 17, 1951) is a former footballer who played for the Nigerian national football team from 1972 to 1980. He won the award for "Footballer of the Year" in 1978 after winning the 1980 African Cup of Nations tournament while representing Nigeria.

Honours

Individual
 Footballer of The Year Award – 1978

International
 1980 African Cup of Nations – 1980

References

External links
 

1951 births
Living people
Sportspeople from Anambra State
Sportspeople from Onitsha
Rangers International F.C. players
1978 African Cup of Nations players
1980 African Cup of Nations players
Africa Cup of Nations-winning players
Nigerian footballers
Association football goalkeepers
Nigeria international footballers
African Games silver medalists for Nigeria
African Games medalists in football
Competitors at the 1978 All-Africa Games